Alan Miller may refer to:

Alan Miller (game designer), American video game designer
Alan Miller (footballer) (1970–2021), English football goalkeeper
Alan Miller (American football) (born 1937), former American football fullback
Alan Miller (journalist) (born 1954), American journalist
Alan Miller (football coach) (1925–2000), Australian rules football coach
Alan B. Miller (born 1937), businessman and founder of Universal Health Services, Inc.
Alan Miller, songwriter on the 2003 album The Mavericks

See also
Alan Millar (born 1947), English philosopher
Allan Miller (born 1929), American actor
Allan Miller (footballer) (1925–2006), Australian rules footballer
Allen Miller (disambiguation)
Al Miller (disambiguation)